Ramon Djamali (born 12 June 1975) is a footballer who currently plays for AS Mont-Dore in the New Caledonian football league. He has been playing as a striker.

He has also played in the Tahitian league for AS Manu Ura.

He made his debut for the New Caledonia national football team in a South Pacific Games match against Papua New Guinea with a goal and scored two more in the tournament.

External links

1975 births
Living people
New Caledonian footballers
New Caledonia international footballers
New Caledonian expatriate footballers
AS Mont-Dore players
Association football forwards
2008 OFC Nations Cup players